Qila Raipur (also spelled as Kila Raipur) is a noted village of Ludhiana district in Punjab, India, as it hosts the annual Qila Raipur Sports Festival, known as the Rural Olympics. The events played often demonstrate the physical strength and valor of the Punjabi men and women.

Geography 

See also 
Raipur
Tharike

References

External links 

Ludhiana district
Villages in Ludhiana district